Ravuri Sravana Bhargavi (born 16 August 1989) is an Indian playback singer. She has recorded several songs in Telugu.

Personal life
Sravana Bhargavi holds a B.Tech. degree from Vignan Institute of Technology and Science, Hyderabad and is currently pursuing M.B.A.

She got engaged to singer Vedala Hemachandra on 9 December 2012 in Hyderabad, India and married him on 14 February 2013.
She has a daughter named Shikhara Chandrika, who was born on 2 July 2016.

Career
Bhargavi hosted a show in 92.7 Big FM in Hyderabad, India. She did voice acting in the films Love Failure and Gabbar Singh.

Other work
She has hosted the show Bol Baby Bol along with her husband Hemachandra. The show is telecasted on Gemini TV. She has also performed in TV show "Super Singer" which was telecasted on MAA TV.

Discography

As playback singer

Filmography

As voice actor

References

External links
 
 
 

Telugu playback singers
1989 births
Living people
Singers from Hyderabad, India
Indian women playback singers
Women musicians from Andhra Pradesh
21st-century Indian women singers
21st-century Indian singers
Film musicians from Andhra Pradesh
Indian voice actresses
Telugu television anchors
Indian television presenters